Mercantile Marine Department, Pakistan is an attached department of Ports and Shipping Wing, Karachi under the Ministry of Ports and Shipping, Government of Pakistan. The department was established in 1930 under the Merchant Shipping Act, 1923, which was repealed and replaced with Merchant Shipping Ordinance No. L II of 2001 (Laws relating to Merchant Shipping) in 2001. The department is headed by the Principal Officer who is also Registrar of Ships and Superintendent of Light Houses in Pakistan.

Functions
Main functions of Mercantile Marine Department, Pakistan (MMD) are appended below:
 Registration of ships and crafts as per Merchant Shipping Ordinance, 2001
 Periodical survey of ships and crafts as per national requirements and International Standards
 Inspection of ships under state port control and flag state controls. Issuance of sea worthiness certificate to ships and crafts
 Examination and approval of loading dangerous cargo plans as per IMDG Code and Compliance inspection thereof
 Collection of applications, fee and other relevant documents for submission to Director General (Ports & Shipping Wing) i.e. applications for Certificate of Competency Examinations (Nautical and Engineering), approval of plans for new constructions, exemptions, approval of SOPEP and Cargo manual and approval of workshop and service stations etc.
 Circulation of navigational warning to Shipping Companies
 Notice to Mariners which also contain Navigational warnings received from hydrographic Department of Pakistan Navy

Surveyors of MMD
Ports & Shipping Wing is  also the Maritime Safety Administration of Pakistan.  The Government of Pakistan plays its role in the International Maritime Organization (IMO) through this Wing.  The functions of Maritime Administration of Pakistan are mainly discharged by the professionals serving on the Technical Posts of this Ministry. Out of 15 Surveyors of the Ministry of Ports & Shipping, approx 11 surveyors (both Nautical and Engineering) work in the Mercantile Marine Department. Recruitment to Technical Posts in the Ports & Shipping Wing is made keeping in view the national & international standards and ensuring induction of experienced and qualified professionals for the pure technical jobs.   However, Ports and Shipping Wing is facing acute shortage of surveyors and examiners.  According to General Secretary of Marine Academy Old Boys Association (MAcOBA) this situation may determinate the good reputation of Pakistan, particularly to its listing to The White List of IMO.

Online verification
Certificates of Competency (CoC) issued by the Ports & Shipping Wing to Deck Officers and Engineer Officers, as well as Rating Certificates by the MMD itself, are verifiable globally at the sub-portal of MMD’s official website.  Online verification has eliminated the chances of forgery of certificates and is a source of scrutiny without loss of time.

See also
Pakistan Merchant Navy
Government Shipping Office
Shipping Master
Ministry of Maritime Affairs (Pakistan)

References

External links
 A Functional and Legal Classification of Corporations, Autonomous Bodies and Attached Departments under the Federal Government

Pakistan federal departments and agencies
Shipping in Pakistan
Pakistan Merchant Navy
Government agencies established in 1930